Garnett USD 365 is a public unified school district headquartered in Garnett, Kansas, United States.  The district includes the communities of Garnett, Greeley, Westphalia, Welda, and nearby rural areas.

History
In 1971 voters in USD 365 defeated a $1.7 million bond issue to build a new high school on a 1,447 no to a 740 yes count.

In 2008 Gordon Myers, the USD 365 superintendent, retired. Donald Blome, who had been the superintendent of Burlingame USD 454 school district, was hired as the new superintendent that year.

Schools
The school district operates the following schools:
 Anderson County High School in Garnett
 Garnett Elementary School in Garnett
 Greeley Elementary School in Greeley
 Mont Ida Elementary School in Welda
 Westphalia Elementary School in Westphalia

See also
 Kansas State Department of Education
 Kansas State High School Activities Association
 List of high schools in Kansas
 List of unified school districts in Kansas

References

External links
 

School districts in Kansas
Education in Anderson County, Kansas